Ink Master: Return of the Masters is the tenth season of the tattoo reality competition Ink Master that premiered on January 9 at 10/9c and concluded on April 24, 2018 with 16 episodes. The first two episodes of the season marked the series' last to air on Spike prior to the network's transition to Paramount Network nine days later on January 18. Despite this, the remaining episodes continued to air on the new channel. The show is hosted and judged by Jane's Addiction guitarist Dave Navarro, with accomplished tattoo artists Chris Núñez and Oliver Peck serving as series regular judges. The winner received $100,000, a feature in Inked magazine and the title of Ink Master.

The premise of this season was having three teams of six artists that were led by three Ink Master winners, season two winner Steve Tefft, season seven winner Anthony Michaels, and season nine winner DJ Tambe (Old Town Ink). The live finale also featured the coaches going head-to-head in the first ever Master Face-Off, in which the winning master would also receive $100,000.

The winner of the tenth season of Ink Master was Joshua Payne, with Juan Salgado being the runner-up. The winner of the Master Face-Off was DJ Tambe, making him the first and only to win two consecutive seasons, with Anthony Michaels being the runner-up.

Judging and ranking

Judging Panel
The judging panel is a table of three or more primary judges in addition to the coaches. The judges and the coaches make their final decision by voting to see who had best tattoo of the day, and who goes home.

Master Jury
Similar to the human canvas jury and jury of peers, the coaches had to select one artist with the worst tattoo of the day to be put up for elimination.

Jury of Peers
At the live finale, the eliminated artists chose one artist and one coach to advance into the final two.

Contestants
The first episode featured 24 artists competing in a two part marathon to be one of the 18 artists which will then narrow down to the team's six members who were drafted through the first day of the competition. In the first part of the marathon, the top 9 artists chose which team they wanted to be part of, while in the second part, the coaches were able to finalize their teams by picking from the remaining 15 artists.

Names, experience, and cities stated are at time of filming.

Chosen

Not chosen

Contestant progress
 Indicates the contestant was a part of Team Anthony.
 Indicates the contestant was a part of Team DJ.
 Indicates the contestant was a part of Team Steve.

  The contestant won Ink Master.
 The contestant was the runner-up.
 The contestant finished third in the competition.
 The contestant advanced to the finale.
 The contestant won Best Tattoo of the Day.
 The contestant was among the top.
 The contestant received positive critiques.
 The contestant received mixed critiques.
 The contestant received negative critiques.
 The contestant was in the bottom.
 The contestant was put in the bottom by the Master Jury.
 The contestant was eliminated from the competition.
 The contestant was put in the bottom by the Master Jury and was eliminated from the competition.
 The contestant returned as a guest for that episode.

Episodes

References

External links
 
 
 

Ink Master
2018 American television seasons